Willem Hesselsz de Vlamingh (November 1640 – ) was a Dutch sea captain who explored the central west coast of New Holland (Australia) in the late 17th century, where he landed in what is now Perth on the Swan River. The mission proved fruitless, but he charted parts of the continent's western coast.

Early life 
Willem de Vlamingh was born in Oost-Vlieland in the Dutch Republic. He was baptised on 28 November 1640. In 1664, de Vlamingh sailed to Novaya Zemlya and discovered Jelmerland. In 1668, he married; his profession was skipper in whaling, and he still lived on the island Vlieland. In 1687, he and his wife sold their "apartment" in the Jordaan.

De Vlamingh joined the Dutch East India Company (VOC) in 1688, and made his first voyage to Batavia in the same year. VOC officials believed it might have run aground on the western coast of Australia.

Rescue mission 

In 1696, de Vlamingh commanded the rescue mission to Australia's west coast to look for survivors of the Ridderschap van Holland that had gone missing two years earlier, and had admiral Sir James Couper on board. There were three ships under his command: the frigate Geelvink, captained by de Vlamingh himself; the Nijptang, under Captain Gerrit Collaert; and the galiot Weseltje, under Captain Cornelis de Vlamingh, son of Willem de Vlamingh. The expedition departed Texel 'strictly incognito' on 3 May 1696 and, because of the Nine Years' War with France, sailed around the coast of Scotland to Tristan da Cunha. In early September the three ships arrived at Cape of Good Hope, where they stayed for seven weeks because of scurvy among the crew. There, Cornelis de Vlamingh took command after Laurens T. Zeeman died. On 27 October, they left using the Brouwer Route on the Indian Ocean route from the African Cape of Good Hope to the Dutch East Indies. On their way east they checked Île Saint-Paul and Île Amsterdam, but no wreckage or survivors were found. On 5 December they sailed on.

On 29 December 1696, de Vlamingh's party landed on Rottnest Island. He saw numerous quokkas (a native marsupial), and thinking they were large rats he named it t Eylandt 't Rottenest ("Rats' Nest Island"). He afterwards wrote of it in his journal: "I had great pleasure in admiring this island, which is very attractive, and where it seems to me that nature has denied nothing to make it pleasurable beyond all islands I have ever seen, being very well provided for man's well-being, with timber, stone, and lime for building him houses, only lacking ploughmen to fill these fine plains. There is plentiful salt, and the coast is full of fish. Birds make themselves heard with pleasant song in these scented groves. So I believe that of the many people who seek to make themselves happy, there are many who would scorn the fortunes of our country for the choice of this one here, which would seem a paradise on earth".

On 10 January 1697, he ventured up the Swan River. He and his crew are believed to have been the first Europeans to do so. They are also assumed to be the first Europeans to see black swans, and de Vlamingh named the Swan River (Zwaanenrivier in Dutch) after the large number they observed there. The crew split into three parties, hoping to catch an Aborigine, but about five days later they gave up their quest to catch a "South lander".

On 22 January, they sailed through the Geelvink Channel. The next days they saw ten naked, black people. On 24 January they passed Red Bluff. Near Wittecarra they went looking for fresh water. On 4 February 1697, he landed at Dirk Hartog Island, Western Australia, and replaced the pewter plate left by Dirk Hartog in 1616 with a new one that bore a record of both of the Dutch sea-captains' visits. The original plate is preserved in the Rijksmuseum in Amsterdam.

de Vlamingh, with his son and Collaert, commanded a return fleet from the Indies on 3 or 11 February 1698, which arrived in his hometown, Amsterdam, on 16 August. However, it is not certain that de Vlamingh was still alive at that point, and burial records from Vlieland around this time do not exist. On an earlier retourship, de Vlamingh had sent Witsen a box with seashells, fruits and vegetation from New Holland (Australia), as well as eleven drawings that Victor Victorsz had made on the expedition. De Vlamingh also included some black swans, but they died on the voyage. Witsen offered the drawings to Martin Lister. Witsen, who had invested in the journey, was disappointed the men had been more interested in setting up trade than in exploring. In 1699, William Dampier would explore the coast of Australia and New Guinea.

References

External links 

 

17th-century Dutch explorers
1640 births
1690s deaths
Dutch polar explorers
Explorers of Western Australia
Maritime exploration of Australia
People from Vlieland
Sailors on ships of the Dutch East India Company